Restless is a British rockabilly band formed in 1978. The group got their name from a song by Carl Perkins. The band performed their first gig in Sudbury in 1980, but the gig was hampered by frontman Mark Harman suffering from stage fright. Their first album, Why Don't You...Just Rock!, was released on Nervous Records in 1982.

Members

Current Members 

 Ben Cooper — drums, saxophone, backing vocals
 Mark Harman — vocals, guitar
 Jeff Bayly — upright bass, backing vocals
 Mick Malone — guitar, backing vocals

Former Members 

 Paul Harman — upright bass, backing vocals
 Steve Whitehouse — upright bass, backing vocals
 Rob Tyler — drums, backing vocals

Discography 

 Why Don't You...Just Rock! (1982, Nervous)
 Do You Feel Restless? (1983, Nervous)
 After Midnight (1986, ABC)
 Beat My Drum (1988, The Madhouse Recording Co.)
 Movin' On (1990, The Madhouse Recording Co.)
 Kickin' Into Midnight (1990, The Madhouse Recording Co.)
 Number Seven (1991, The Madhouse Recording Co.)
 Figure It Out (1993, Vinyl Frontier)
 Three Of A Kind (1995, Vinyl Japan)
 The Lost Sessions (1996, Vinyl Japan)
 Got Some Guts-Unplugged (1997, Vampirella Music)
 Do Your Thing (2002, Raucous)
 Got It Covered (2011, Crazy Love)
 Sounds Like Restless (2012, I Sold My Soul Media)
 Seconds Out (2014, Bluelight)
 Originals (2015, Bluelight)
 Ready to Go! (2020, Bluelight)

References 

British rock and roll music groups
British rockabilly musicians
Musical groups established in 1978
Musical groups from Suffolk
Rockabilly music groups